The 1981 Kansas City Royals season was their 13th in Major League Baseball. The 1981 season was interrupted by a players strike from June 12-July 31, and resumed on August 10. Major League Baseball officials decided to split the season, and the division winners of both halves would advance to the playoffs. The Royals were 20-30 and in fifth place in the American League West when the strike began, but won the second half with a 30-23 mark. Dick Howser replaced Jim Frey as manager on August 31. Kansas City's overall 50-53 record made the Royals the first team in MLB history to reach the postseason with a losing mark. Kansas City lost to the first half American League West winner Oakland Athletics 3-0 in the Division Series.

Offseason
January 6, 1981: Derek Botelho was signed as a free agent with the Kansas City Royals.

Regular season 
 August 10, 1981: Cal Ripken Jr. made his major league debut for the Baltimore Orioles in a game against the Royals.

Season standings

Record vs. opponents

Notable transactions 
 April 3, 1981: Bombo Rivera was signed as a free agent by the Royals.
 June 8, 1981: 1981 Major League Baseball draft
Dave Leeper was drafted by the Royals in the 1st round (23rd pick). Player signed June 10, 1981.
David Cone was drafted by the Royals in the 3rd round. Player signed June 10, 1981.

Roster

Player stats

Batting

Starters by position 
Note: Pos = Position; G = Games played; AB = At bats; H = Hits; Avg. = Batting average; HR = Home runs; RBI = Runs batted in

Other batters 
Note: G = Games played; AB = At bats; H = Hits; Avg. = Batting average; HR = Home runs; RBI = Runs batted in

Pitching

Starting pitchers 
Note: G = Games pitched; IP = Innings pitched; W = Wins; L = Losses; ERA = Earned run average; SO = Strikeouts

Other pitchers 
Note: G = Games pitched; IP = Innings pitched; W = Wins; L = Losses; ERA = Earned run average; SO = Strikeouts

Relief pitchers 
Note: G = Games pitched; W = Wins; L = Losses; SV = Saves; ERA = Earned run average; SO = Strikeouts

ALDS 

Oakland wins series, 3-0.

Farm system

Notes

References

External links 
1981 Kansas City Royals at Baseball Reference
1981 Kansas City Royals at Baseball Almanac

Kansas City Royals seasons
1981 Major League Baseball season
Kansas City Royals